Portage Lake is a lake in Hubbard County, in the U.S. state of Minnesota.

Portage Lake was so named from the fact it was on an Ojibwe portage path.

See also
List of lakes in Minnesota

References

Lakes of Minnesota
Lakes of Hubbard County, Minnesota